The University of British Columbia is a public research university located principally near Vancouver, British Columbia, Canada. 

The University of British Columbia may also refer to the following:
  One of the university's three satellite campuses:
 University of British Columbia Okanagan, located in Kelowna, British Columbia, Canada.
 University of British Columbia Robson Square, located in Vancouver, British Columbia, Canada. 
 University of British Columbia Great Northern Way Campus, located in Vancouver, British Columbia, Canada. 
 University of British Columbia Press, an affiliated publishing house, sometimes referred to simply as University of British Columbia in bibliographical citations